Kundala Valley Railway was the first monorail system in India, later converted to a  narrow-gauge railway, that operated in Kundala Valley, Munnar of Idukki district in Kerala, India. The railway line had 35 km length.

History

Monorail (1902–1908) 

Kundala Valley Railway was built in 1902 and operated between Munnar and Top Station in the Kannan Devan Hills of Kerala . This railway was built to transport tea and other goods. Initially a cart road was cut in 1902, then later replaced by a monorail goods carriage system along the road leading from Munnar to Top Station for the purpose of transporting tea and other products from Munnar and Madupatty to Top Station. This monorail was based on the Ewing System and had a small wheel placed on the track while a larger wheel rested on the road to balance the monorail. This was similar to the Patiala State Monorail Trainways. The monorail was pulled by bullocks. Top Station was a transshipment point for delivery of tea from Munnar to Bodinayakkanur. Tea chests arriving at Top Station were then transported by an aerial ropeway from Top Station  down hill to the south to Kottagudi, Tamil Nadu, which popularly became known as "Bottom Station". The tea was shipped  by cart to Bodinayakkanur, then by rail to other places in India and by ship to England.

Narrow-gauge railway (1908–1924) 

In 1908, the monorail was replaced by a  narrow-gauge light railway. Light steam locomotives were used to pull trains to stations at Madupatty and Palaar.

Closure 

The Great flood of 99 completely destroyed the Kundala Valley Railway in 1924, and the line was never rebuilt.

Revival efforts 
In 2019, the Kerala Tourism Department decided to revive the Kundala Valley Rail in lines of Darjeeling Himalayan Railway following a preliminary study that was conducted by DTPC Idukki and Kannan Devan Hills Plantation. In following October there was a high-level meeting of stake holders and officials that suggested PPP Model for implementation. In Kerala State Budget 2021 T. M. Thomas Isaac announced that Tata has agreed to provide land for the revival of rail project as a heritage rail.

Remains 
The Munnar railway station building now houses the regional office of Tata Tea. The railway tracks have been replaced by a road in front of this building. Aluminium Bridge near Munnar which was once a railway bridge on the line, has since been converted to road traffic. The Top Station near Munnar derived its name from this railway route it was the top most station in the rail route,

References

External links 

Monorails in India
2 ft gauge railways in India
Closed railway lines in India
Defunct railway companies of India
Railway companies disestablished in 1924
Rail transport in Kerala
1924 disestablishments in India
Geography of Idukki district
Indian companies established in 1902